Zeng Wenhui (born 8 February 2005) is a Chinese street skateboarder and two-time Chinese Champion. At the 2020 Summer Olympics, she finished sixth in the women's street skateboarding event, the first event of its kind to be included in an Olympic program.

Career 
Zeng was selected to train for skateboarding in 2017, around age twelve. Before taking up skateboarding, she had practiced kung fu from age six. She made her professional skateboarding debut in 2018 at the International Skateboarding Open (ISO) in Nanjing, where she placed thirteenth in the qualifiers of the women's street event. She placed fourth at the 2018 Asian Games and won the China National Skateboarding Championship in 2019 and 2020.

At the Tokyo 2020 Olympics, Zeng was one of twenty athletes who competed in the women's street skateboarding event. Zeng qualified for the event by virtue of ranking 21st in the World Skate Olympic World Skateboarding Rankings. In the semifinals, Zeng came in 6th place, advancing to the finals round, where she finished the competition in 6th place.

References

External links
 
 Zeng Wenhui at The Boardr

Living people
2005 births
Chinese skateboarders
Female skateboarders
Olympic skateboarders of China
People from Zhaoqing
Skateboarders at the 2020 Summer Olympics
Skateboarders at the 2018 Asian Games